Angus Williams (August 25, 1927 - June 13, 2019) was a college football player and well-known insurance executive of Tampa, Florida. The first touchdown in the victory over Georgia in 1949 was a 37-yard pass from Williams to Don Brown followed by a 21-yard run from Chuck Hunsinger. He returned a punt for the touchdown in the 7–6 loss to Miami in 1949. One source calls him "star of the 1945 Gators". He was captain of the 1950 team. He is a member of Hillsborough High's athletic hall of fame.

References

 

1927 births
2019 deaths
American football quarterbacks
Florida Gators football players
Players of American football from Tampa, Florida